Xinhua is a town of Linhe District, Bayannur, Inner Mongolia, People's Republic of China, located  northeast of downtown. , it has 29 villages under its administration.

See also
List of township-level divisions of Inner Mongolia

References

Township-level divisions of Inner Mongolia
Bayannur